Henri-Eugène-Adrien Farcot (20 February 1830 in Sainville – 14 March 1896 in Saint-Maur-des-Fossés) was a French clock-maker, industrialist, inventor, mechanical-engineer, aeronaut, occasional writer and one of the most celebrated conical pendulum clock makers.

In 1853 he established the Manufacture d’horlogerie E. Farcot with headquarters, from 1855 (previously in rue Vieille-du-Temple, 75, Paris), in rue des Trois-Bornes, 39, Paris, wherein he worked until his retirement in the late 1880s, same as the successors, his son-in-law the Belgian Henri-Charles Wandenberg, or Vandenberg, until December 1903 and Paul Grenon (Wandenberg's nephew) until 1914. Between October 1855-March 1856 the company's name changed to Farcot et Cie, and in 1887 it was renamed Farcot et Wandenberg, although the partnership was officially constituted in April 1890.

Throughout his career path, Eugène Farcot was awarded with one honorable mention and four medals in the following expositions: Besançon 1860 (bronze), London 1862 (honorable mention), Paris (1863 bronze, 1867 bronze & 1878 silver), as well as Henri Wandenberg, both with a silver medal in Paris 1889 and a gold medal in Paris 1900.

In addition to clock-making, he was a member of the Société aérostatique et météorologique de France and the also defunct Chambre syndicale d'horlogerie de Paris. The Musée Farcot, in Sainville, preserves memories of his life, travels and work.

Patents 
Of the nineteen patents registered to his name between 1855 and 1886, 16 are linked to horology. They are by chronological order (files for each patent containing description and drawings can be consulted in the archives of the Institut national de la propriété industrielle (INPI):

 22637, 03/03/1855 – Mouvement de pendule
 37159, 23/06/1858 – Perfectionnements apportés à l’horlogerie
 41812, 11/08/1859 – Perfectionnements apportés à l’horlogerie
 44007, 23/02/1860 – Perfectionnements apportés à l’horlogerie
 50962, 24/08/1861 – Réveille-matin avertisseur
 53502, 25/03/1862 – Perfectionnements apportés à l’horlogerie
 65992, 26/01/1865 – Perfectionnements aux réveille-matin
 84057, 20/01/1869 – Timbre d'appel, avertisseur mobile de porte, et sonnerie télégraphique simplifiée
 89384, 31/03/1870 – Réveil horizontal à marche rotative et silencieuse

 89455, 26/03/1870 – Perfectionnements apportés et appliqués spécialement dans la fabrication des réveille-matin
 92460, 14/08/1871 – Pendule de nuit
 101995, 29/01/1874 – Perfectionnement et transformation dans la fermeture des porte-monnaie à cadre, pouvant s'appliquer à tous objets de fantaisie, tels que porte-cigares, cigarettes, carnets, bonbonnières, etc.
 102593, 14/03/1874 – Perfectionnements apportés aux pendules de nuit lumineuses
 107030, 01/03/1875 – Système de pendule-écusson applique, à remontoir auxiliaire et à tirage rentrant
 166518, 10/08/1875 – Device for winding clocks (US patent of 107030)
 167502, 07/03/1885 – Système de pendule à indications diurnes et nocturnes
 176982, 24/06/1886 – Pendule courtoise
 177703, 31/07/1886 – Réveil courtois
 252398, 12/12/1895 – Application du phonographe aux pièces d’horlogerie (registered to the name of the Société Farcot et Wandenberg)

Monumental conical pendulum clock series 

A class of its own among the conical pendulum clocks are the monumental timepieces commercialized between 1862 and 1878. When this model debuted at the London International Exhibition of 1862, it was presented as the first application of the conical pendulum to statuary. In addition to the British capital, it was also displayed in the Paris Exposition des beaux-arts appliqués à l’industrie (1863), as well as in the major world's fairs held in Paris (1867 & 1878) and Philadelphia (1876).

In his own words, Eugène Farcot explained the origins of his idea during the 1867 Paris universal exposition (translated from the French):

Each mystery clock of this one-of-a-kind series was individually made and therefore, no two are alike. They are distinguished for their artistic/horological excellence where foremost, award-winning people from various arts, crafts and sciences, created a masterpiece of Second Empire decorative arts.

Besides a remarkable precision in timekeeping, one of their most distinctive characteristics is the slow continual circular motion at a constant speed (instead of the conventional side to side swinging motion) of the noiseless pendulum, tracing a conical trajectory in space, hence its name.

List of units 
It is unknown the total number of units crafted, so far 13 have been found. It is unclear if the company used a separate serial number for its large-scale conical pendulum clocks, although probably no more than twenty were ever made. Those known are:

 No. 0 – Lambert Castle, New Jersey, USA. Purchased in 1869 for $10,000.
 No. 8 – The Roosevelt New Orleans Hotel, New Orleans, USA
 No. 9 – Private collection, USA
 No. 16 – Drexel University, Pennsylvania, USA. Acquired in 1867 for $6,000.
 No. 19 – National Watch and Clock Museum (NWCM), Pennsylvania, USA
 No. 23 – Private collection, USA

 No. 25 – Cliffe Castle Museum, Yorkshire, UK
 No. 28 – Cooper Hewitt, Smithsonian Design Museum, New York, USA
 No. 30 – Private collection, USA
 No. 44195 – Private collection, USA
 No. 02495, Museo Cerralbo, Spain
 No serial number, The Dolder Grand Hotel, Switzerland
 The one depicted in the drawing by Lamy with two dials in the pedestal front, whereabouts unknown

Gallery

The largest conical pendulum clock 

In 1878, the largest conical pendulum clock ever built was erected in the missing Palais du Champ-de-Mars on the occasion of the Paris Exposition universelle internationale. It was his ultimate contribution to the conical pendulum clock, a type of timepiece not invented by the Frenchman, but that he brought to a new level of sophistication and engineering. Not to mention that he also helped to its popularization offering affordable mantel models, some with a patent of invention.

The mechanical marvel was reviewed in several publications, next are included three of them:

During the Siege of Paris 

While Farcot experienced with a light engine built for him for aerostats, caught his right thumb in the gears and had to be amputated, expressing later when the Franco-Prussian War (translated from the French):

This, however, did not impede him, during the Siege of Paris (1870–71), to leave the city on 12 October 1870 piloting the ballon monté (balloon mail) Louis Blanc, circumventing the siege and the Prussian shootings in order to transport the mail, government dispatches and eight carrier pigeons. He, and Auguste Traclet from the Association Colombophile de Paris, arrived in Béclers (Belgium) three hours later, becoming the first French aeronaut in Belgium.

Despite bearing the name of the politician Louis Blanc, this, who was present at the departure, had refused to fly in a balloon mail when Wilfrid de Fonvielle asked him.

Funereal discourse 
Discourse pronounced before the tomb of the horologist by Paul Garnier, vice-president of the Chambre syndicale d'horlogerie de Paris (translated from the French):

Publications 
 La navigation atmosphérique, 1859.
 Un voyage aérien dans cinquante ans (unpublished), 1864.
 Invention et contrefaçon. A mes juges et à mes confrères, 1865.
 De Paris à Tournay en 3 heures. Histoire du ballon le Louis Blanc, 1873
 Voyage du ballon le Louis-Blanc, 1874.

References

External links 
 Article on the monumental conical pendulum clocks by E. Farcot, pp. 75-93
 Video playlist about the large conical pendulum clocks
 File patent 22637 (1855, France)
 File patent 166518 (1875, USA)
 Musée Farcot
 A clock by E. Farcot at the Musée des arts et métiers
 Monumental conical pendulum clock at Lambert Castle (USA)
 Idem at Drexel University (USA)
 Idem at the National Watch and Clock Museum (USA)
 Idem at Cliffe Castle (UK)
 

French clockmakers
1830 births
1896 deaths